Mark William Lamb (born August 3, 1964) is a Canadian former professional ice hockey player, and current general manager and head coach of the Prince George Cougars of the Western Hockey League (WHL). Lamb was previously the head coach of the Tucson Roadrunners of the American Hockey League (AHL) and the Swift Current Broncos of the WHL. Lamb was born in Ponteix, Saskatchewan but grew up in Swift Current, Saskatchewan.

Playing career
Lamb was drafted 72nd overall in the 1982 NHL Entry Draft by the Calgary Flames. Lamb went on to play just one game for the Flames before signing with the Detroit Red Wings in 1986. In his one season with Detroit, Lamb played 22 regular season games. Lamb was claimed by the Edmonton Oilers in 1987 where he spent a total of five seasons, winning the Stanley Cup with them in 1990. Lamb was then claimed in the 1992 NHL Expansion Draft by the Ottawa Senators and served as the team's co-captain alongside Brad Shaw during the 1993–94 NHL season. On March 5, 1994, Lamb was traded to the Philadelphia Flyers for the Flyers' 1988 first round pick Claude Boivin and minor league goaltender Kirk Daubenspeck. He played just 27 games for the Flyers before he was traded to the Montreal Canadiens for cash. He finished his career with four seasons in the International Hockey League with the Houston Aeros and one in the Deutsche Eishockey Liga in Germany for Landshut EV. In total, Lamb played 403 regular season games in the National Hockey League, scoring 46 goals and 100 assists for 146 points.

Coaching and manager career
Lamb retired as a player in 2000. A year later he returned to Edmonton as an assistant coach. In 2002, Lamb moved to the Dallas Stars under the same role. Following a season which saw the Stars finish out of the playoffs with a record of 36–35–11, Lamb was then the head coach and general manager of the Western Hockey League's Swift Current Broncos.

On June 21, 2016, Lamb was named head coach to the Tucson Roadrunners, the American Hockey League affiliate of the Arizona Coyotes. He was relieved of duties after one season.

In 2018, he was hired as the general manager of the Prince George Cougars in the WHL.

Awards and achievements
 WHL East First All-Star Team – 1984
1990 Stanley Cup championship (Edmonton).

Career statistics

Coaching statistics

References

External links
 

1964 births
Living people
Adirondack Red Wings players
Billings Bighorns players
Calgary Flames draft picks
Calgary Flames players
Canadian expatriate ice hockey players in Germany
Canadian ice hockey centres
Canadian ice hockey coaches
Cape Breton Oilers players
Colorado Flames players
Dallas Stars coaches
Detroit Red Wings players
Edmonton Oilers coaches
Edmonton Oilers players
EV Landshut players
Houston Aeros (1994–2013) players
Ice hockey people from Saskatchewan
Medicine Hat Tigers players
Moncton Golden Flames players
Montreal Canadiens players
Nanaimo Islanders players
Nova Scotia Oilers players
Ottawa Senators players
People from Swift Current
Philadelphia Flyers players
Stanley Cup champions
Swift Current Broncos coaches
Tucson Roadrunners coaches